

Home Building & Loan Association v. Blaisdell, 290 U.S. 398 (1934), was a decision of the United States Supreme Court holding that Minnesota's suspension of creditors' remedies was not in violation of the Contract Clause of the United States Constitution. Blaisdell was decided during the depth of the Great Depression and has been criticized by modern conservative and libertarian commentators.

Background and decision
In 1933, in response to a large number of home foreclosures, Minnesota, like many other states at the time, extended the time available for mortgagors to redeem their mortgages from foreclosure. The appellee owned a lot in Minneapolis that was in the foreclosure process. The extension had the effect of enlarging the mortgagor's estate contrary to the terms of the contract.

The Supreme Court upheld the statute, reasoning that the emergency conditions created by the Great Depression "may justify the exercise of [the State's] continuing and dominant protective power notwithstanding interference with contracts." Blaisdell was the first time the court extended the emergency exception to purely economic emergencies.

In the holding, Justices Hughes and Roberts sided with the Three Musketeers (Supreme Court). The Four Horsemen of Reaction came down on the other side of the ruling.

While the Blaisdell judgment itself might have been held to apply only in limited instances of economic emergency, by the late 1930s the emergency exception doctrine had expanded dramatically.

Criticism
Adherents of the Chicago school of economics have characterized Blaisdell among the Court precedents that have diminished constitutional protection of individual property rights. Richard Epstein's (the Laurence A. Tisch Professor of Law at the New York University School of Law and Adjunct Scholar at the American libertarian think tank Cato Institute) criticisms have been some of the most vocal:

See also
 List of United States Supreme Court cases, volume 290
 Gold Clause Cases (1935)
 Constitutional challenges to the New Deal

References

Further reading
 
 
 Fliter, John A. and Derek S. Hoff (2012). Fighting Foreclosure: The Blaisdell Case, the Contract Clause, and the Great Depression. Lawrence: University Press of Kansas.

External links
 
 

United States Constitution Article One case law
United States Supreme Court cases
United States Supreme Court cases of the Hughes Court
1934 in United States case law
Contract Clause case law
Great Depression in the United States
Legal history of Minnesota
History of Minneapolis
Foreclosure
Constitutional challenges to the New Deal